KUAI (570 AM) is a radio station broadcasting a "Real Country" 70s 80s 90s early 2000s format. Licensed to Eleele in the U.S. state of Hawaii, the station serves the Kauai area. The station is currently owned by Pacific Media Group, through licensee Pacific Radio Group, Inc.

History
On February 1, 1987, the station changed its call sign to KQNG. The station changed to the current KUAI call sign on March 17, 2015.

References

External links

UAI
Radio stations established in 1939
1939 establishments in Hawaii